Young Poong Books (YP Books) is a major South Korean book store chain headquartered in Gangnam-Gu, Seoul, South Korea. Along with Kyobo Book Centre and Bandi & Luni's, YP Books constitutes one of the three largest book store companies in South Korea. YP Books is a subsidiary of the Young Poong Group.

See also
List of book stores

References

External links
YP Books 

Bookstores of South Korea
Jongno District